2-Hydroxyethyl terephthalic acid is an organic compound with the formula HOC2H4O2CC6H4CO2H.  It is the monoester of terephthalic acid and ethylene glycol. The compound is a precursor to poly(ethylene terephthalate) (PET), a polymer that is produced on a large scale industrially. 2-Hydroxyethyl terephthalic acid is a colorless solid that is soluble in water and polar organic solvents. Near neutral pH, 2-hydroxyethyl terephthalic acid converts to 2-hydroxyethyl terephthalate, HOC2H4O2CC6H4CO2−.

Occurrence and reactions
2-Hydroxyethyl terephthalic acid is an intermediate in both the formation and hydrolysis of PET.  It is produced on a massive scale as the first intermediate in certain routes to PET.  Specifically, it is produced in the course of the thermal condensation of terephthalic acid and ethylene glycol:
HOC2H4OH  +  HO2CC6H4CO2H → HOC2H4O2CC6H4CO2H + H2O
Further dehydration of 2-hydroxyethyl terephthalic acid gives PET.

It is also produced by the partial hydrolysis of PET, as catalyzed by the enzyme PETase:
H[O2CC6H4CO2C2H4]nOH  +  (n−1) H2O   →  n HO2CC6H4CO2C2H4OH

References

Primary alcohols
Terephthalate esters